Scotland's Futures Forum is a think tank set up by the Scottish Parliament. It has the aim of looking beyond the immediate electoral cycle to consider the opportunities and problems that the country might face.

History
The forum was launched in August 2005, with the first meeting chaired by Presiding Officer George Reid. When it was launched, the Forum webpage on the Parliament website included links to two other corporate lobby groups, the International Futures Forum and the Global Business Network which had been influential in setting up the Forum.  In March 2006, the forum launched its own website.

Purpose
According to the Parliament:

'Scotland's Futures Forum, the Scottish Parliament's initiative to develop strategic thinking on the issues which will shape Scotland's future, moves forward today with the announcement of the eight individuals who will make up the Forum's board of directors. The Scottish Parliamentary Corporate Body (SPCB) has agreed to create a new company, with the SPCB as the sole member, which extends the Parliament's outreach and participation work to academia, the arts, blue chip companies, civic Scotland and entrepreneurs. Leading figures from the private and public sectors have volunteered their services on a two year initial basis.'

In 2007 the forum considered matters such as ageing and addiction. In 2013, together with the Goodison Group, they published a report on future of education in Scotland.

Board of directors
In 2022 the directors are:

Alison Johnstone MSP, Presiding Officer of the Scottish Parliament (Chair)
Maggie Chapman MSP
Kirsten Hogg, Head of Policy & Research at SCVO
Diarmaid Lawlor, Associate Director (Place) at the Scottish Futures Trust
Sarah Munro, Director of the Baltic Mill Centre for Contemporary Art
Stuart McMillan MSP
Esther Roberton, Chair of Fife Cultural Trust, Director of the Fife Housing Group
Alex Rowley MSP
Brian Whittle MSP

References

External links

Political and economic think tanks based in the United Kingdom
Think tanks based in Scotland